Randolph H. Ridgley (June 24, 1895 – death unknown), nicknamed "Buck", was an American Negro league second baseman in the 1920s.

A native of Warrenton, Virginia, Ridgley made his Negro leagues debut in 1920 with the Brooklyn Royal Giants and Baltimore Black Sox. He went on to play for Baltimore for two more seasons, then played for the Harrisburg Giants and Washington Potomacs in 1923.

References

External links
  and Seamheads

1895 births
Year of death missing
Place of death missing
Baltimore Black Sox players
Brooklyn Royal Giants players
Harrisburg Giants players
Washington Potomacs players
Baseball second basemen
Baseball players from Virginia
People from Warrenton, Virginia